Power of Love is the seventh studio album by American singer-songwriter Luther Vandross, released in North America by Epic on April 26, 1991, following the critical and commercial success of his sixth album Any Love (1988). Power of Love received critical acclaim from most critics, earning Vandross a number of awards and accolades including two American Music Awards and two Grammy Awards. It reached number seven on the US Billboard 200 album chart, while topping the Top R&B Albums chart for five nonconsecutive weeks. On the latter chart, it was Vandross's last number one for twelve years until Dance with My Father was released. The album was later certified double platinum by the RIAA.

Critical reception
Dave Obee from Calgary Herald wrote, "This disc offers more of what we've come to expect: solid R&B vocals, a touch of funk in the guitars and a touch of gospel from supporting singers. A gem is Luther's duet with Martha Wash on the classic "I (Who Have Nothing)" (consider it the definitive version). The title cut is a perfect introduction to an album that's wonderfully seductive. So if you're having trouble getting in the mood - Luther never has, it seems - just slip on this disc and relax. When it ends an hour later, you won't feel the need to put anything else on."

Track listing

Personnel
Credits adapted from the album's liner notes.

Technical

 Produced by Luther Vandross and Marcus Miller
 Engineered and mixed by Ray Bardani
 Recorded by Fred Bova, Brian Cowieson, Carrie McConkey, Michael Morongell and Shelly Yakus
 Recording assistants – Martin Brumbach, Mark Harder, Robert Hart, John Herman, Rob Jaczko, Chad Munsey, Brian Schueble and Rich Travali
 Mastered by Steve Hall at Future Disc (Hollywood, California)
 Production coordinator – Marsha Burns
 Art direction and design – George Corsillo 
 Photography – Matthew Rolston

Performers and musicians

 Luther Vandross – lead and backing vocals, vocal arrangements (1, 2, 3, 5)
 Jason Miles – synthesizer sound programming
 Marcus Miller – keyboards (1-4, 6), synthesizer programming (1-4, 6, 8), rhythm arrangements (1-4, 6), bass guitar (2, 3, 4, 6, 10), backing vocals (2), additional keyboards (7, 8, 9)
 Reed Vertelney – synthesizer programming (1)
 Nat Adderley, Jr. – acoustic piano (2), keyboards (5, 10), synthesizer programming (5, 10), rhythm and string arrangements (5, 10)
 Hubert Eaves III – keyboards (7, 9), synthesizer programming (7, 9), rhythm arrangements (7, 9)
 John "Skip" Anderson – keyboards (8), synthesizer programming (8), rhythm arrangements (8)
 Paul Jackson, Jr. – guitar (2, 3, 5, 6, 9)
 Paulinho da Costa – wind chimes (2, 6), percussion (5, 8, 10)
 Kirk Whalum – saxophone solo (10)
 Joe Soldo – string contractor (5)
 Alfred Brown – string contractor (10)
 Tawatha Agee – backing vocals (1, 2, 3, 5, 6, 7)
 Lisa Fischer – backing vocals (1, 2)
 Cissy Houston – backing vocals (1, 2, 3, 5, 6, 7)
 Darlene Love – backing vocals (1, 2, 9)
 Paulette McWilliams – backing vocals (1, 2, 3, 6, 7, 9)
 Fonzi Thornton – backing vocals (1, 2, 5), vocal contractor (all tracks)
 Brenda White King – backing vocals  (1, 2, 3, 5, 6, 7, 9)
 Genobia Jeter – backing vocals (2, 9)
 Pat Joyner – backing vocals (2) 
 Kevin Owens – backing vocals (2)
 Tamira C. Sanders – backing vocals (2)
 Cindy Mizelle – backing vocals (5, 6)
 Michelle Cobbs – backing vocals (9)  
 Martha Wash – lead and backing vocals (10)

Charts

Weekly charts

Year-end charts

Certifications

See also
List of number-one R&B albums of 1991 (U.S.)

References

1991 albums
Epic Records albums
Legacy Recordings albums
Luther Vandross albums
Albums produced by Luther Vandross
Albums produced by Marcus Miller